The Cradle, Calicut – An Executive Women & Child Care Centre is a hospital in Calicut, Kerala, India. It specialises in gynecology and neonatal care. It is a joint initiative of Apollo Hospitals and Dr Kutty's Healthcare.

See also

 List of hospitals in India

References

External links
 , the hospital's official website

2010 establishments in Kerala
Hospitals established in 2010
Hospitals in Kozhikode
Maternity hospitals in India